Brad James (born July 7, 1978) is an American actor. James is best known for his role as Todd in the sitcom Tyler Perry's For Better or Worse.

Early years
James was raised by his maternal grandparents. He spent four years as a U.S. Marine serving in combat units. Although known for being athletic and performing his own stunts in films, James is working with an ankle that never healed properly after he broke it in late 2000, while serving in the US Marine Corps. During his time of service, he studied the hand-to-hand combat, line-training and Brazilian ju-jitsu.

Career
James has appeared in many commercials for national brands including Walmart, AutoTrader.com and BlackBerry. In his first credited speaking role on-screen, he played the lead role of John Merser in Maverick Entertainment's Champion Road. In 2013, James won the Georgia's "Best Actor" award at the Georgia Entertainment Gala. In 2013, he was cast to portray the role of Adam in the movie Marry Me for Christmas.

Personal life
James and actress Keshia Knight Pulliam were married in an intimate ceremony in September 2021. The two began dating in 2019 after meeting on the set of the TV movie Pride and Prejudice: Atlanta. In late 2022, it was announced they were expecting their first child together. Additionally, James is the stepfather to Ella (b. 2017), Knight Pulliam's daughter with ex-husband, retired National Football League player Edgerton Hartwell.

Filmography

Film and TV Movies

Television

References

External links
 

1978 births
Living people
American male television actors
African-American male actors
21st-century African-American people
20th-century African-American people